Sporidiobolus is a genus of Basidiomycota found in the family Sporidiobolaceae. It contains 8 species. It is one of the few genera within Basidiomycota that can reproduce asexually in yeast-form.

Species
Sporidiobolus johnsonii
Sporidiobolus longiusculus
Sporidiobolus metaroseus
Sporidiobolus microsporus
Sporidiobolus pararoseus
Sporidiobolus ruineniae
Sporidiobolus ruineniae var. ruineniae
Sporidiobolus salmonicolor
Sporidiobolus veronae

References

External links

Basidiomycota genera
Sporidiobolales